Corita Kent (November 20, 1918 – September 18, 1986), born Frances Elizabeth Kent and also known as Sister Mary Corita Kent, was an American artist, designer and educator, and former religious sister. Key themes in her work included Christianity, and social justice. She was also a teacher at the Immaculate Heart College.

Corita was born Frances Elizabeth Kent on November 20 in the year of 1918. At 18 years of age Kent entered the Sisters of the Immaculate Heart, which were known to be very progressive and welcomed creativity. Frances joined a teaching order, taking the name Sister Mary Corita. Initially she taught young children on an Inuit Reservation in British Columbia  until returning to Los Angeles to study for her bachelor's degree at Immaculate Heart College and her master's degree at University of Southern California. She was the head of the art department at Immaculate Heart College. where she also taught a wide variety of different painting styles. Her artwork contained her own spiritual expression and love for her God.

Kent's primary medium was screen printing, also known as Serigraphy. She became self-taught after she sent away for a DIY silk screening kit. Her innovative methods pushed back the limitations of two-dimensional media of the times. Kent's emphasis on printing was partially due to her wish for democratic outreach, as she wished for affordable art for the masses. Her artwork, with its messages of love and peace, was particularly popular during the social upheavals of the 1960s and 1970s.

Due to opposition from Cardinal James McIntyre (who had a particular dislike for Kent), the sisters would eventually be forced out of their schools in Los Angeles—with the exception of the college—and most of the sisters left the order entirely, while keeping the larger school. Kent, however, would move to the East Coast and begin to work independently.

After a cancer diagnosis in the early 1970s, she entered an extremely prolific period in her career, including the Rainbow Swash design on the LNG storage tank in Boston, and the 1985 version of the United States Postal Service's special Love stamp.

In recent years, Corita has gained increased recognition for her role in the pop art movement. Critics and theorists previously failed to count her work as part of any mainstream "canon," but in the last few years there has been a resurgence of attention given to Kent. As both a nun and a woman making art in the twentieth century, she was in many ways cast to the margins of the different movements she was a part of.

Corita's art was her activism, and her spiritually-informed social commentary promoted love and tolerance.

Biography

Early life and education 
Frances Elizabeth Kent, fifth child of Robert Vincent and Edith Genevieve, was born in Fort Dodge, Iowa in 1918. Kent's parents were artistically inclined, especially her father, and always encouraged her art. In junior high, Corita and her siblings attended Blessed Sacrament School which was partially staffed by Sisters of the Immaculate Heart of Mary. When attending junior high, Kent's art potential was noticed by several nuns.Kent graduated from Los Angeles Catholic Girls' High School in 1936. Upon entering the Roman Catholic order of IHM sisters in Los Angeles in 1936, Kent took the name Sister Mary Corita. She took classes at Otis (now Otis College of Art and Design) and Chouinard Art Institute and earned her BA from Immaculate Heart College in 1941. She earned her MA at the University of Southern California in Art History in 1951.

Career 
Between 1938 and 1968 Kent lived and worked in the Immaculate Heart Community. She taught in the Immaculate Heart College and became the chair of its art department in 1964. Her classes at Immaculate Heart were an avant-garde mecca for prominent, ground-breaking artists and inventors, such as Alfred Hitchcock, John Cage, Saul Bass, Buckminster Fuller and Charles & Ray Eames. Kent credited Charles Eames, Buckminster Fuller, and art historian Dr. Alois Schardt for their important roles in her intellectual and artistic growth. By the early 1950s, she had such a unique and well-known aesthetic and teaching style that clergy members from all over the country were sent to be educated at Immaculate Heart College. Her students were drawn to her selflessness and unique teaching methods such as large class assignments like asking students to create 200 drawings or take three hours to draw their arm without looking at what they were creating.

Kent toured widely the following decade. After the Second Vatican Council, Kent transformed Immaculate Heart College’s annual Mary’s Day procession into a community celebration which was part of the sister’s campaign to bring secular people together. During this time, Kent’s work became increasingly political, addressing events such as the Vietnam War and humanitarian crises. For example, she was commissioned by the Physicians for Social Responsibility to create what she called "we can create life without war" billboards. Tensions between the order and church leadership were mounting, with the Los Angeles archdiocese criticizing the college as "liberal" and Cardinal James McIntyre labeling the college as "communist" and Kent’s work as "blasphemous." Due to this, Kent returned to secular life in 1968 as Corita Kent. Most sisters followed suit and the Immaculate Heart College closed in 1980. Corita Kent also embraced the many different revolutionary movements going on in the world at this time. These movements included the anti-Vietnam War movement, Civil Rights, and Women’s Rights.

Kent created several hundred serigraph designs, for posters, book covers, and murals. She did not attend the unveiling of the Love stamp because she wanted it to happen at the United Nations and was not happy with the message that was sent when the design was unveiled on the Love Boat. Her 1985 work "love is hard work" was made in response. The stamp itself sold successfully—over 700 million times. Kent was also commissioned to create work for the 1964 World’s Fair in New York, and the 1965 IBM Christmas display in New York. Her 1951 print, The Lord is with Thee had won first prizes in printmaking at the Los Angeles County Museum of History, Science, Art, and at the California State Fair.

Kent's work has been exhibited extensively beginning in 1952. By the 1960s, Kent had already shown work at 230 exhibitions across the country and her work was included in the collections the Achenbach Foundation Graphic Arts, the Fogg museum, the Los Angeles County Museum of Art, the Metropolitan Museum of Art, the Museum of Modern Art, the National Gallery of Art, the National Serigraph Society, the Norman Rockwell Museum, the San Francisco Museum of Modern Art, the Smithsonian Institution, and the Whitney Museum of American Art.

Death 
Corita Kent was diagnosed with ovarian cancer in 1974. After this diagnosis, in the Back Bay of Boston, Kent confined her art to water color painting and only pursued printmaking in order to say something substantiative. The Papers of Corita revealed Kent had kept two calendars towards the end of her life. This displayed that Kent, in the midst of fighting cancer, followed a strict diet, answered and wrote letters, and wanted to live and continue to create art. She ultimately died on September 18, 1986 in Watertown Massachusetts at the age of sixty-seven. She left her copyrights and unsold works to the Immaculate Heart Community formed by the former IHM sisters in Los Angeles.

Artistic style
Corita Kent worked at the intersection of several powerful—and at times contradictory—cultural, political, and religious influences. Corita Kent, inspired by the works of Andy Warhol, began using popular culture as raw material for her work in 1962. Her screen prints often incorporated archetypical product brands of American consumerism alongside spiritual texts. Her design process involved appropriating an original advertising graphic to suit her idea; for example, she would tear, rip, or crumple the image, then re-photograph it. She often used grocery store signage, texts from scripture, newspaper clippings, song lyrics, and writings from literary greats such as Gertrude Stein, E. E. Cummings, and Albert Camus as the textual focal point of her work.

E. E. Cummings was one of Kent's earliest and strongest influences. She quotes him in her work separately more than a dozen times and was inspired by a line from one of his lectures to create an entire series of alphabet prints. In her 1966 piece Tame It's Not, she uses quotes from Winnie the Pooh, Kierkegaard, and an ad slogan for men's cologne. Using everyday consumer items, like Wonderbread, she was able to bring words and thoughts about her religion to a familiar product that people saw and used every day. By creating juxtaposition between formally acknowledged or respected "art" and the art Corita saw in her everyday world—at the supermarket, on a walk, in the classroom—she elevated the banal to the holy. "Like a priest, a shaman, a magician, she could pass her hands over the commonest of the everyday, the superficial, the oh-so-ordinary, and make it a vehicle of the luminous, the only, and the hope filled," noted Corita's friend, theologian Harvey Cox.

Corita's earliest work was mostly iconographic, drawing inspiration and material from the Bible and other religious sources. Her style is heavily text-based, with scripture passages or positive quotes often encompassing entire compositions with bold and highly saturated typefaces. Despite the often surreal or disorienting compositions of her works, her pieces are "always about something." By the 1960s, her work started becoming increasingly political. For example, her silkscreen print, stop the bombing (1967) is a large piece protesting the use of nuclear weaponry in bold, blue letters against a white and red background.

Kent produced her oeuvre during her time at Immaculate Heart College in Los Angeles in response to the Catholic reform in the 1960s by the Vatican Council II as well as several political and social issues happening at the time. Her work itself aided in the Vatican II movement, a movement to modernize and make relevant the Catholic Church. Kent’s use of English church texts in her work, for example, made an impact on the Vatican II’s efforts to normalize conducting Mass in English. Because of her strongly political art, she and others left their order to create the Immaculate Heart Community in 1970 to avoid problems with their archdiocese.

The "Big G" logo that Kent appropriated from General Mills was to stress the idea of ‘goodness’, while the elements from Esso gasoline ads were meant to project the internal power within humans. Unsurprisingly, a Christian subtext does underscore several of her artworks, but not all, which are open to interpretation.

One of Kent’s prints, love your brother (1969), depicts photographs of Martin Luther King Jr. overlaid with her handwritten words, "The king is dead. Love your brother," producing one of her more serious artworks, and presenting her views on politics and human nature. Her collages took popular images, often with twisted or reversed words, to comment on the political unrest of the period, many of which could have been found at any number of marches or demonstrations, some of which she attended herself.

Legacy
Kent had solo exhibitions at the National Museum of Women in the Arts and her work is in several art museums, including the Whitney Museum of American Art, the Museum of Fine Arts, Boston and The Metropolitan Museum of Art. An archive is dedicated to her at the Immaculate Heart Community Headquarters in Hollywood, CA. Some of Sister Corita's papers and early artwork are in Schlesinger Library, in the Radcliffe Institute, Harvard University. Recent solo exhibitions of Kent's work include Someday is Now: The Art of Corita Kent at the Tang Museum at Skidmore College and There Will Be New Rules Next Week at Dundee Contemporary Arts.

The Corita Art Center, a gallery and archive dedicated to preserving and promoting the work and spirit of Corita Kent, was originally founded as the Corita Prints in 1969 in North Hollywood. It changed its name when it moved to the Immaculate Heart property in 1997 and is located within the offices of the Immaculate Heart Community Headquarters in Hollywood, CA.

Corita Kent received the American Institute of Graphic Arts Medal in 2016.

Awards and recognition
1966 Woman of the year LA Times
1967 on the cover of Newsweek 
2016 American Institute of Graphic Arts Medal

Partial list of publications
 1967 Footnotes and Headlines: A Play-Pray Book, Sister Corita
 1968 To Believe in God, poem by Joseph Pintauro, color by Sister Corita
 1969 city, uncity, poems by Gerald Huckaby, pages by Corita Kent
 1970 Damn Everything but the Circus, Corita Kent
 1990 Primary Colors: The Story of Corita, Jeffrey Hayden
 1992 Learning By Heart: Teachings to Free the Creative Spirit, Corita Kent (posthumously) and Jan Steward
 2000 "Life Stories of Artist Corita Kent (1918–1986): Her Spirit, Her Art, the Woman Within" (Unpublished Doctoral Dissertation, Gonzaga University), Barbara Loste
 2000 Eye, No. 35, Vol. 9, edited by John L. Walters, Quantum Publishing
 2006 Come Alive! The Spirited Art of Sister Corita, Julie Ault

Stage Plays 

 2023 Little Heart - The story of Corita Kent, by Irene O'Garden

References

External links
The Corita Art Center

 

 

1918 births
1986 deaths
20th-century American women artists
American graphic designers
Women graphic designers
American pop artists
20th-century American Roman Catholic nuns
American women printmakers
Artists from Iowa
Artists from Los Angeles
Chouinard Art Institute alumni
Deaths from cancer in Massachusetts
Educators from California
American women educators
Immaculate Heart College alumni
Otis College of Art and Design alumni
People from Fort Dodge, Iowa
American stamp designers
Women stamp designers
University of Southern California alumni
20th-century American printmakers
Catholics from Iowa
AIGA medalists